(James) Henry Broderick was an Irish Labour Party politician. He was first elected to Dáil Éireann as a Labour Party Teachta Dála (TD) for the Longford–Westmeath constituency at the June 1927 general election. He was re-elected at the September 1927 general election but lost his seat at the 1932 general election. He stood unsuccessfully at the 1933, 1937 and 1943 general elections.

References

Year of birth missing
Year of death missing
Labour Party (Ireland) TDs
Members of the 5th Dáil
Members of the 6th Dáil